Gross domestic product (GDP) is the market value of all final goods and services from a nation in a given year. Countries are sorted by nominal GDP estimates from financial and statistical institutions, which are calculated at market or government official exchange rates. Nominal GDP does not take into account differences in the cost of living in different countries, and the results can vary greatly from one year to another based on fluctuations in the exchange rates of the country's currency. Such fluctuations may change a country's ranking from one year to the next, even though they often make little or no difference in the standard of living of its population.

Comparisons of national wealth are also frequently made on the basis of purchasing power parity (PPP), to adjust for differences in the cost of living in different countries. Other metrics, nominal GDP per capita and a corresponding GDP (PPP) per capita are used for comparing national standard of living. On the whole, PPP per capita figures are less spread than nominal GDP per capita figures.

The rankings of national economies have changed considerably over time, the United States surpassed the British Empire's output around 1916, which in turn had surpassed the Qing dynasty in aggregate output decades earlier. Since China's transition to a market-based economy through controlled privatisation and deregulation, the country has seen its ranking increase from ninth in 1978, to second in 2010; China's economic growth accelerated during this period and its share of global nominal GDP surged from 2% in 1980 to 18% in 2021. Among others, India has also experienced an economic boom since the implementation of economic liberalisation in the early 1990s.

The first list includes estimates compiled by the International Monetary Fund's World Economic Outlook, the second list shows the World Bank's data, and the third list includes data compiled by the United Nations Statistics Division. The IMF definitive data for the past year and estimates for the current year are published twice a year in April and October. Non-sovereign entities (the world, continents, and some dependent territories) and states with limited international recognition (such as Kosovo and Taiwan) are included in the list where they appear in the sources.

Table
The table initially ranks each country or territory with their latest available estimates, and can be reranked by either of the sources

The links in the "Country/Territory" row of the following table link to the article on the GDP or the economy of the respective country or territory.

See also

Countries:
 List of countries by GDP (nominal) per capita
 List of countries by GDP (PPP)
 List of countries by GDP (PPP) per capita
 List of countries by past and projected GDP (nominal)
 List of countries by past and projected GDP (PPP)

Other entities:
 List of cities by GDP
 List of continents by GDP
 List of country subdivisions by GDP over 200 billion US dollars
 List of regions by past GDP (PPP)

Notes

References

Gdp (Nominal)
Gdp (Nominal)
Gross domestic product